A thesis statement usually appears in the introductory paragraph of a paper. It offers a concise summary of the main point or claim of the essay, research paper, etc. It is usually expressed in one sentence, and the statement may be reiterated elsewhere. It contains the topic and the controlling idea.

There are two types of thesis statements: direct and indirect. The indirect thesis statement does not state the explicit reasons, while the direct thesis statement does. If one writes, "I love New York for 3 reasons," the fact that they love New York is the topic, and "3 reasons" is an indirect thesis statement. The essay will contain the 3 reasons. If one writes, "I love New York because of the food, the jazz clubs, and the Broadway Shows," it is a direct thesis statement that tells the reader what each section or body paragraph is going to be about.

The thesis statement is developed, supported, and explained in the course of the paper by means of examples and evidence. Thesis statements help organize and develop the body of the writing piece. They let readers know what the writer's statement is and what it is aiming to prove. A thesis statement does not necessarily forecast the organization of an essay, which can be more complex than its purpose.

Structure
The thesis statement will reflect the kind of paper being written. There are three kinds of papers: analytical, expository, and argumentative. The structure of a thesis statement depends upon the nature of determining essay type. In simple terms, first a thesis statement will have a main topic sentence formed from questioning it, then the writer's statement regarding the topic sentence, and finally ends with the specific supporting points detailing the writer's statement for justifying its relation with the topic sentence. In general, it should have a supportable opinion (specific/focused) and clear intent for the essay.

See also
 Topic sentence
 Conclusion (writing)

References

Further reading 

 Jonathan Culler and Kevin Lamb. Just being difficult? : academic writing in the public arena Stanford, Calif. : Stanford University Press, 2003. 
 William Germano. Getting It Published, 2nd Edition: A Guide for Scholars and Anyone Else Serious About Serious Books. . Read a chapter.
 Wellington, J. J. Getting published : a guide for lecturers and researcherLondon; New York : RoutledgeFalmer, 2003. 
 John A. Goldsmith et al. "Teaching and Research" imic Keywords: A Devil's Dictionary for Higher Education. .
 Martin Horton-Eddison. "First Class Essays" Hull, United Kingdom: Purple Peacock Press, 2012
 Carol Tenopir and Donald King. "Towards Electronic Journals: Realities for Librarians and Publishers. SLA, 2000. .
 Björk, B-C. (2007) "A model of scientific communication as a global distributed information system" Information Research, 12(2) paper 307.
 Furman, R. (2007). Practical tips for publishing scholarly articles: Writing and publishing in the helping professions. Chicago: Lyceum Books.
 Cargill, M. and O'Connor, P. (2013) Writing  Research Articles. West Sussex, UK. John Wiley & Sons Inc. 2nd Ed.

External links
 Thesis Statement, Rensselaer Polytechnic Institute
 Lisa A. Kirby, Writing Effective Thesis Statements, North Carolina Wesleyan College
 Guide to Writing Master Thesis in English, Tomas Bata University in Zlín, Pg. 48
 Writing tips: Thesis statements

Essays
School terminology
Writing
Academic publishing